Elena Smolyanova (born 16 February 1986) is an Uzbekistani athlete specialising in the shot put. She competed for Uzbekistan in shot put at the 2012 Summer Olympics.

Her personal bests are 17.68 metres outdoors (Almaty 2012) and 15.60 metres indoors (Ashgabat 2017).

In 2019, she completed her sports career and went to serve in the National Guard of Uzbekistan.

International competitions

References

1986 births
Living people
People from Tashkent Region
Uzbekistani female shot putters
Olympic female shot putters
Olympic athletes of Uzbekistan
Athletes (track and field) at the 2012 Summer Olympics
Asian Games competitors for Uzbekistan
Athletes (track and field) at the 2014 Asian Games
Athletes (track and field) at the 2018 Asian Games
Asian Indoor Athletics Championships winners
21st-century Uzbekistani women